The 2000 NCAA Division I Women's Golf Championships were contested at the 19th annual NCAA-sanctioned golf tournament to determine the individual and team national champions of women's Division I collegiate golf in the United States.

The tournament was held at the Trysting Tree Golf Course in Corvallis, Oregon.

Arizona won the team championship, the Wildcats' second.

Jenna Daniels, also from Arizona, won the individual title.

Individual results

Individual champion
 Jenna Daniels, Arizona (287, +3)

Team leaderboard

 DC = Defending champion
 Debut appearance

References

NCAA Women's Golf Championship
Golf in Oregon
NCAA Women's Golf Championship
NCAA Women's Golf Championship
NCAA Women's Golf Championship